The Singapore Ambassador to Russia is the official representative of the Republic of Singapore to the Russian Federation.

List of representatives

See also
 Russia–Singapore relations
 Russian Ambassador to Singapore
 Singapore Ambassador to China
 Singapore Ambassador to the United States
 List of High Commissioners and Ambassadors of Singapore

References

External links
 Embassy of Singapore in Moscow

 
Singapore
Russia